Marios Lomis (born 24 January 1995) is a Dutch professional footballer who currently plays as a forward for Sirens in Maltese Premier League. Besides the Netherlands, he has played in the United States.

Career

College & youth
Lomis started playing football in his native Netherlands with Koninklijke HFC, ADO '20 and VV Noordwijk, where he scored 13 goals in his final season with the Hoofdklasse club before moving to the United States to play college soccer at Creighton University in their 2017 season. He left Creighton after just one year, where he scored 5 goals in 17 appearances.

Professional
On 17 January 2018, Lomis signed with United Soccer League club North Carolina FC. After suffering an ankle injury in the first half of the 2019 season, Lomis was named North Carolina FC's Comeback Player of the Year for 2019.

On 2 January 2020, Lomis made the move to USL Championship side El Paso Locomotive. After five games with El Paso, he transferred back to North Carolina FC on 7 August 2020.

On 12 March 2021, Lomis joined Greenville Triumph in USL League One.

References

1995 births
Living people
Association football forwards
Creighton Bluejays men's soccer players
Dutch expatriate sportspeople in the United States
Dutch footballers
Expatriate soccer players in the United States
North Carolina FC players
El Paso Locomotive FC players
People from Bennebroek
Footballers from North Holland
USL Championship players
Koninklijke HFC players
Greenville Triumph SC players
USL League One players
Sirens F.C. players
Maltese Premier League players
Expatriate footballers in Malta